Isle of the Onondagas also known as Big Island is an island on the Mohawk River south of Scotia in Schenectady County, New York.

References

Islands of New York (state)
Mohawk River
River islands of New York (state)